(born 11 December 1931) is a Japanese film and stage actress. She appeared in over 100 films between 1953 and 1963. She won the first Grand Prix of Miss Nippon in 1950.

Career
Yamamoto was born on 11 December 1931, in Nishi-ku, Osaka, to a cotton wholesaler located in Senba. Raised in Izumi and then Izumiōtsu, she attended Hamadera Elementary School and began learning traditional Japanese dance from Rokunosuke Hanayagi (花柳禄之助) of the Rokuju Hanayagi (花柳禄寿) school. She graduated from what is now Kyoto Ōki High School.

She won the first Miss Nippon beauty contest in 1950. In 1953 she made her film debut at the Daiei Studios. She became one of Daiei's top actresses.

Yamamoto was considered one of Japan's most beautiful women, with "noble" features that represented the classic ideal of Japanese beauty. As such, she was well-suited for costumed parts in the era's popular period dramas, with her less-frequent modern roles (in films like Ozu's Equinox Flower and Ichikawa's Being Two Isn't Easy) often shot in "movie star" closeups that placed her apart from the films' contemporary storytelling.

In 1963, when her contract came up for renewal, she insisted on changes. The head of Daiei, Masaichi Nagata, refused, unilaterally fired her, and then invoked an agreement between the major studios to prevent her from working again in film. Even though she has appeared frequently on stage and on television, she has not appeared in a film since then.

Selected filmography
 (十代の誘惑 Jūdai no yūwaku) (1953)
 The Romance of Yushima (1955)
 A Girl Isn't Allowed to Love (1955)
 Suzakumon (1957)
 Equinox Flower (1958)
 Hitohada Kujaku (1958)
 The Loyal 47 Ronin (忠臣蔵 Chūshingura) (1958)
 The Snowy Heron (1958)
 Unforgettable Trail (1959)
 Satan's Sword (1960)
 The Demon of Mount Oe (1960)
 Jokyo (1960)
 Hunting Rifle (1961)
 Being Two Isn't Easy (私は二歳, Watashi wa nisai) (1962)
 An Actor's Revenge (1963)

Awards
 1959 Blue Ribbon Awards for Best Actress
 1961 Kinema Junpo Award for Best Actress

References

External links

1931 births
Living people
Japanese film actresses
Japanese beauty pageant winners
Actresses from Osaka
20th-century Japanese actresses
Japanese television actresses
Japanese stage actresses
Recipients of the Medal with Purple Ribbon